Khal-e Kheyl (also Romanized as Khāl-e Kheyl, Khāl-e Khīl, and Khāl Kheyl) is a village in Garmab Rural District, Chahardangeh District, Sari County, Mazandaran Province, Iran. At the 2006 census, its population was 552, in 134 families.

References 

Populated places in Sari County